John Halifax, Gentleman is a British drama television series produced by John McRae that originally aired on the BBC in five episodes in 1974. It was an adaptation of the novel John Halifax, Gentleman by Dinah Craik, who was credited as Mrs Craik.

Dramatised by Jack Ronder and directed by Tristan DeVere Cole, it was screened in the Sunday teatime slot on BBC One,  which usually showed adaptations of classic novels. The script editor was Alistair Bell, Christine Ruscoe was the designer and Ursula Reid was in charge of costumes.

Main cast
 Robert Coleby – John Halifax
 Gwen Taylor – Ursula March
 Tony Calvin – Phineas Fletcher

References

External links
 

1970s British drama television series
1974 British television series debuts
1974 British television series endings
BBC television dramas